Antigua and Barbuda competed at the 2012 Summer Olympics in London, United Kingdom from 27 July to 12 August 2012. This was the nation's ninth appearance at the Summer Olympics.

Four athletes from Antigua and Barbuda were selected to the team, competing in athletics and swimming. Sprinter Daniel Bailey reprised his role to carry the nation's flag in the opening ceremony, since he did so in 2004. Antigua and Barbuda, however, has yet to win its first Olympic medal.

Athletics

Three athletes, two male and one female, achieved qualifying standards in the following athletics events:

Men

Women

Key
 Note–Ranks given for track events are within the athlete's heat only
 Q = Qualified for the next round
 q = Qualified for the next round as a fastest loser or, in field events, by position without achieving the qualifying target
 NR = National record
 N/A = Round not applicable for the event
 Bye = Athlete not required to compete in round

Swimming

One female swimmer, achieved the qualifying standard in the following swimming event:

Women

See also
 Antigua and Barbuda at the 2012 Summer Paralympics
 Antigua and Barbuda at the 2011 Pan American Games

References

External links
 

Nations at the 2012 Summer Olympics
2012
2012 in Antigua and Barbuda sport